The Gulch is a neighborhood on the south fringe of downtown Nashville, Tennessee, near Interstate 40, Interstate 65 and Interstate 24. It is known to be a trendy and hip neighborhood, and a popular destination for locals, college students, and visitors.

Improvement District
A Gulch Business Improvement District (GBID) was created in 2006 and is managed by the Nashville Downtown Partnership. The area is currently undergoing an urban revitalization, with new residents, office space, and retail shops moving into newly built or recently renovated buildings. On February 17, 2009, it was announced the Gulch neighborhood had been certified as a LEED Green Neighborhood. It was the first neighborhood in the American South to become so certified, and one of only a few in the United States to do so by that date. The announcement was made by Mayor Karl Dean and developer MarketStreet Enterprises.

In 2016, construction of a pedestrian bridge was announced to connect the Gulch to the South Broadway neighborhood. The Gulch is home to one of Nashville's most famous and historic music venues, The Station Inn. Also near the Gulch is The Mercy Lounge, and the historic Union Station Hotel.

Neighborhood boundaries
The Gulch neighborhood is bound:
 On the north, by the northern property line of lots fronting on the south side of Broadway
 On the west, by Interstate 65
 On the south, by Interstate 40
 On the east, by the CSX rail line

References

External links

Explore The Gulch (official GBID website)
Nashville Gulch MarketStreet development website
The Gulch In Nashville (Gulch News, Bars, Restaurants, etc.)
Gulch land use and urban design plan

Neighborhoods in Nashville, Tennessee